Qızmeydan (known as Astraxanka until 1999) is a village and municipality in the Shamakhi Rayon of Azerbaijan. It has a population of 1,096.  The municipality consists of the villages of Qızmeydan and Yeni Qızmeydan.

References

Populated places in Shamakhi District